List of Regional Science High School Union (RSHS) campuses:

Luzon
Regional Science High School for Region 1 – Ilocos Region
Regional Science High School for Region 2 – Cagayan Valley
Cordillera Regional Science High School
Regional Science High School III – Central Luzon
Cavite Science Integrated School – CALABARZON
MIMAROPA Regional Science High School
Bicol Regional Science High School
Quezon City Science High School – Metro Manila

Visayas
Regional Science High School for Region VI – Western Visayas
Dumaguete Science High School – Central Visayas
Regional Science High School for Eastern Visayas

Mindanao
Regional Science High School for Region IX – Zamboanga Peninsula
Gusa Regional Science High School – Northern Mindanao
Davao Oriental Regional Science High School
Regional Science High School for Region 12 – Soccsksargen
Caraga Regional Science High School
ARMM Regional Science High School

Regional Science High School Union